Katarzyna Tomiak-Siemieniewicz (born in 1987 in Niedźwiedz, Poland) is a captain  in the Polish Air Force and the first Polish woman to become a fighter pilot. She currently flies the MiG-29 at the  22nd Tactical Air Base near Królewo Malborskie in northern Poland .

Biography 
She is a graduate of Eugeniusz Horbaczewski High School (named for Polish pilot and World War II ace Eugeniusz Horbaczewski) in Zielona Góra. Between 2006 and 2011, she studied at the  Polish Air Force Academy (dubbed "school of the eaglets") in Dęblin. She graduated with the title of master of engineering . Following her officer promotion to the rank of second lieutenant, she was assigned to the  22nd Tactical Air Base in Malbork as a pilot in the Aviation Action Group's air squadron on December 5, 2011 .

Tomiak-Siemieniewicz underwent technical training in the construction and operation of the MiG-29 fighter at the Engineering and Aviation Training Center in Dęblin and completed flight preparation at the 23rd Air Base. She began instructor-aided training flights in May of 2012 in the MiG-29UB aircraft. On October 18, 2012, as the first of the members of the  Polish Air Force Academy's class of 2011 stationed at Malbork, she completed her first solo flight in the MiG-29G. On November 28, 2014, she received her first combat duty assignment for NATO and the Republic of Poland's defense system. She is the first woman to serve as a fighter pilot in the Polish Air Force.

Tomiak-Siemieniewicz has indicated that she is faced with sexist comments regarding her aspirations, revealing that when she expressed her wish to join the military as a primary school student to a current Polish serviceman, he responded stating that it was not a woman's career .

In 2018, she starred in one of NATO's promotional videos for the "We are NATO" campaign. 

As of 2018, Tomiak-Siemieniewicz possessed roughly 500 flight hours in the MiG-29 aircraft and about 750 overall flight hours. By December 31st, 2019, she had flown a total of 1300 hours across various aircraft. Though she specializes in operations of the MiG-29, she also flies the Cessna 150, PZL-130 Orlik, TC-1, and PZL TS-11 Iskra.

Personal life 
Among friends, Katarzyna Tomiak-Siemieniewicz uses the callsign "Witch". Her husband, also a pilot, is known to the media as "Leszek". She has two brothers.

Awards and honors 
 Readers of the online portal lotniczapolska.pl awarded then-second-lieutenant Katarzyna Tomiak-Siemieniewicz with the title "Woman of the Year" in the Lotnicze Orły 2012 plebiscite.
 In January of 2013, she was nominated for the "Buzdygany 2012" award of the "Polska Zbrojna" monthly journal.
 On February 5, 2018, she was named Pilot of the Year by the commander of the 22nd Tactical Air Base in Malbork .
 She received 5th place in the "Ten ambitious women in the Polish military 2018" ranking published by the Foundation for Women in Defense and Security (milwomen.pl).

Footnotes

External links 
 Kobiety w Siłach Powietrznych – ppor. Katarzyna Tomiak pilot MiG-29 – from Dzień Dobry TVN (Author: Marta Buchla)

References 

Content in this edit is from the existing Polish Wikipedia article at :pl: Katarzyna Tomiak-Siemieniewicz; see its history for attribution.

Polish aviators
Polish Air Force personnel
1987 births
Living people